Backes (pronounced Backs or BACK-uhs) is a German surname. Notable people with the name include:

 Constanze Backes, German soprano in opera and concert
 David Backes (born 1984), American ice hockey player
 David Backes (author) (born 1957), American author and professor
 Fernand Backes (born 1930), Luxembourgish boxer
 Joan Backes, American artist
 Ron Backes (born 1963), American shot putter
 Scott Backes, American mountaineer

See also
 Backes & Strauss, English company that designs and produces high-end luxury timepieces and jewellery
 Back (disambiguation)
 Bakes, surname